Yakymiv is a village (selo) in Lviv Raion, Lviv Oblast (province) of Western Ukraine. It belongs to Zhovtantsi rural hromada, one of the hromadas of Ukraine. 
Yakymiv is a small village, that has the population just about 299 persons. Local government is administered by Vyrivska village council.

History 
The first chronicle mention of Yakymiv dates back to 1578.

Until 18 July 2020, Yakymiv belonged to Kamianka-Buzka Raion. The raion was abolished in July 2020 as part of the administrative reform of Ukraine, which reduced the number of raions of Lviv Oblast to seven. The area of Kamianka-Buzka Raion was split between Chervonohrad and Lviv Raions, with Yakymiv being transferred to Lviv Raion.

Church of the Cathedral of St. John the Baptist of the Ukrainian Greek Catholic Church 

The church was built in 1852.

The wooden church stands at the beginning of Yakimov, on the rise, to the right of the road (if you go from the side of Vyrov). Until 1939, the church belonged to the Roman Catholic administration.

Cultural life of the village 
On October 13, 2019, the village of Yakymiv was visited by the American astronaut Heidemarie Stefanyshyn-Piper. Her father, Mykhailo Stefanyshyn, was born in the village. He was deported to Germany during World War II. After the war, he married a German woman, and together they emigrated to the United States. There they had a daughter and three sons, whom they raised in Ukrainian traditions. Gaidi is proud of her Ukrainian roots and sincerely enjoyed the opportunity to visit Yakymiv to learn more about her past. It was a very warm and sincere meeting. From the Ukrainian land, the first woman astronaut of Ukrainian origin and the eighth conqueror of star routes in the world was presented with a fragrant loaf.

The village has a People's House, a wooden church of the Cathedral of St. John the Baptist, a library.

Geography 

References

External links 
 weather.in.ua/ Yakymiv
 Якимів/Церква Собору Св. Івана Хрестителя 1852 
Villages in Lviv Raion